Carter is an unincorporated area and census-designated place (CDP) in Parker County, Texas, United States. It was first listed as a CDP prior to the 2020 census.

It is in the northern part of the county, spread over several low ridges and valleys draining south to the Clear Fork of the Trinity River and north to Walnut Creek, a tributary of the West Fork of the Trinity River. Texas State Highway 51 passes through the east side of the CDP, leading northeast  to Springtown and southwest  to Weatherford, the Parker county seat.

References 

Populated places in Parker County, Texas
Census-designated places in Parker County, Texas
Census-designated places in Texas